Plan is a municipality located in the Sobrarbe comarca, province of Huesca, Aragon, Spain. According to the 2010 census the municipality has a population of 336 inhabitants, and is the main populated center in the Gistau Valley. Its postal code is 22367.

The Ibón de Plan or Basa de la Mora lake is located within its municipal term and is said to be enchanted according to locals.

The village is one of the last places where Chistabino, the local dialect of Aragonese can be heard.

The "caravan of women"» 
In 1985, Plan made Spanish news since local bachelors organized a "caravan of women" after watching the American 1951 Western Westward the Women.
At the time, there were over forty single men and just one single woman.
Most of the local women had emigrated.
An advertisement in the press calling for "women between 20 and 40 with marriage intentions for Pyrenees village" resulted in 33 marriages, revitalizing Plan.
Since then, other villages have organized similar "caravans"

See also
Peña Montañesa
Real Monasterio de San Victorián

References

External links

Bassa de la Mora - Ibon de Plan
Ibon Basa de la Mora - Ibon de Plan
Centre Excursionista de Catalunya Bulletin

Municipalities in the Province of Huesca